Vladimir Yakovlev can refer to:

 Vladimir Yakovlev (general), Russian general
 Vladimir Yakovlev (journalist), Russian journalist
 Vladimir Yakovlev (sailor) (1930-2009), Soviet Olympic sailor
 Vladimir Anatolyevich Yakovlev (born 1944), Russian politician